The Georgia State Panthers softball team represents Georgia State University in NCAA Division I college softball. The team currently competes in the Sun Belt Conference. It competed in the Atlantic Sun Conference (A-Sun) prior to joining the CAA. The Panthers play their home games at Georgia State's Panthersville sports complex in the Bob Heck Softball Complex, and are currently coached by head coach Roger Kincaid.

History
Prior to 1985, Georgia State Panthers played slow-pitch softball in the New South Women's Athletic Conference (NSWAC). The  softball team first began playing fast-pitch softball in 1985, still in NSWAC, before moving to the Atlantic Sun Conference, which was called the Trans American Athletic Conference (TAAC) at the time. In 2005 the Panthers began competing in the CAA.

The team has claimed six tournament titles, including two in the NSWAC (1989, 1990) and three in the TAAC (1992, 1993, and 1994). The Panthers also claimed the 2011 tournament title in the CAA. They were tournament runners up during the 1986, 1987, 1988, and 1998 seasons.

The program began playing fast-pitch softball in the 1985 season when then head-coach Bob Heck transitioned the team into the TAAC. Initially, the team started out with bare facilities using a rough recreation field lacking locker rooms, scoreboards, or any other basic amenities. Coach Heck is recognized as moving and improving the facilities to its current location in Panthersville, Georgia. He also acted as groundskeeper for the site. Heck retired during the 2011 season and was replaced by current head-coach Roger Kincaid.

When Georgia State began playing fast-pitch softball in 1985, it was the first team in the State of Georgia to do so at the Division I level.

On July 1, 2013, Georgia State joined the Sun Belt Conference for all sports.

Stadium
The Panthers play in the 500-seat Robert E. Heck Softball Complex. The complex was named in April 2003 after former head coach Bob Heck. The first game was played at the field in 1985.

Head coaches
The Panthers have had three head coaches:

Season-by-season results

See also
List of NCAA Division I softball programs

References

External links